Mateo Matic (born 7 January 1996) is a Swiss professional footballer who plays as a goalkeeper for FC Thun in the Swiss Challenge League.

Professional career
Matic is a youth product of Grasshopper, and began his career with their reserves in 2013. He joined Schaffhausen on loan between 2017 and 2018. He made his professional debut for Grasshopper in a 3-0 Swiss Super League loss to FC Sion on 22 May 2019.

In the 2020–21 Swiss Challenge League, he was instrumental in helping Grasshopper achieve promotion back to the Swiss Super League. In the following season, however, he was relegated to backup and cup goalkeeper. As a result, he chose not to renew his contract at the end of the season. He captained the squad in his last and only league game of the season, a 0–3 defeat to BSC Young Boys.

On 29 August 2022, he signed with Swiss Challenge League side FC Thun for the remainder of the first half of the season.

International career
Born in Switzerland, Matic is of Croatian descent. He is a youth international for Switzerland.

References

External links
 
 SFL Profile

1996 births
Living people
People from Surselva District
Swiss men's footballers
Switzerland youth international footballers
Swiss people of Croatian descent
Grasshopper Club Zürich players
FC Schaffhausen players
FC Thun players
Swiss Super League players
Swiss Challenge League players
Association football goalkeepers
Sportspeople from Graubünden